The swallow tanager (Tersina viridis) is a species of Neotropic bird in the tanager family Thraupidae. It is the only member of the genus Tersina. It is found widely throughout South America, from eastern Panama to far northern Argentina. The species is sexually dimorphic: the female is a yellow-green and the male a turquoise blue with a small deep black face and upper throat patch.

Taxonomy
The swallow tanager was formally described in 1811 by the German zoologist Johann Karl Wilhelm Illiger under the binomial name Hirundo viridis. The type locality is eastern Brazil. The species is now the only member of the genus Tersina that was introduced in 1819 by the French ornithologist Louis Jean Pierre Vieillot. The genus name is from the French Tersine, an unidentified bird described by Georges-Louis Leclerc, Comte de Buffon. The specific epithet viridis is the Latin for "green". A molecular phylogenetic study of the tanager family published in 2014 found that the swallow tanager is sister to the honeycreepers in the genus Cyanerpes.

Three subspecies are recognised:
 T. v. grisescens Griscom, 1929 – north Colombia
 T. v. occidentalis (Sclater, PL, 1855) – east Panama and Colombia (except north) east to the Guianas and north Brazil and south to Bolivia (except southeast) and northwest Argentina
 T. v. viridis (Illiger, 1811) – east, south Brazil, southeast Bolivia, Paraguay and northeast Argentina

Description
This bird is strongly sexually dimorphic. The male is bright turquoise blue with a black face and throat. The turquoise flanks have black barring and the lower belly is white. The female is bright green with dusky-olive barring on the flanks. She lacks the black face mask. They are gregarious but do not associate with other species. They mainly eat fruit but they will also sally after insects from an exposed perch. The swallow tanagers are unique among tanagers in that they will sometimes dig a hole in a bank for a nest.

References

External links
 Xeno-canto: audio recordings of the swallow tanager
Swallow Tanager videos on the Internet Bird Collection
Stamps (for Paraguay, Suriname, Venezuela) with RangeMap
Swallow Tanager photo gallery VIREO

swallow tanager
Birds of South America
Birds of Colombia
Birds of Venezuela
Birds of Ecuador
Birds of the Guianas
Birds of the Amazon Basin
Birds of Brazil
Birds of Bolivia
Birds of Paraguay
swallow tanager